Noam Pikelny (born February 27, 1981, in Chicago, Illinois) is an American banjoist. He is a member of the group Punch Brothers and was previously in Leftover Salmon as well as the John Cowan Band. Pikelny is a nine-time Grammy Award nominee, winning once in 2019 for Best Folk Album.

History
Pikelny started playing banjo when he was 8 years old. He took lessons at Chicago's Old Town School of Folk Music. In high school, he began studying with Greg Cahill of the Chicago bluegrass band The Special Consensus.

Pikelny was in Leftover Salmon from 2002 until leaving in 2004 to play in the John Cowan Band from 2004 to 2006 - playing on the band's "New Tattoo" record, just before the formation of Punch Brothers in that same year. Chris Thile of Nickel Creek was planning to form a string quintet, but did not know what direction he wanted to take it, except that he wanted it to include fiddler Gabe Witcher. After Thile had a jam session with Witcher, Pikelny, bassist Greg Garrison and guitarist Chris Eldridge, he decided he wanted the band to be a quintet. The band was called "The How to Grow a Band" in 2006 when they were the backing band on Thile's solo release How to Grow a Woman from the Ground, as well as the following supporting shows.  After on and off touring throughout 2007 coinciding with Nickel Creek's Farewell (For Now) Tour, the band's name was changed to the "Tensions Mountain Boys" briefly, and subsequently to Punch Brothers (borrowed from a short story by Mark Twain). Punch Brothers released their first official album as a band, Punch, on Nonesuch Records on February 26, 2008.

A native of Skokie, Illinois, Pikelny currently resides in Nashville, Tennessee.

Awards
Pikelny was the recipient of the 2010 Steve Martin Prize for Excellence in Banjo and Bluegrass.  On November 5, 2010, he appeared on Late Show with David Letterman playing a comedic version of "Dueling Banjos" alongside Martin, and later performed with Martin and Punch Brothers. Pikelny's 2011 album Beat the Devil and Carry a Rail was nominated for Best Bluegrass Album in the 2013 Grammy Awards.

In 2014 at the International Bluegrass Music Awards he was named banjo player of the year by the International Bluegrass Music Association, an award that he also received in 2017. He also received the album of the year award for Noam Pikelny Plays Kenny Baker Plays Bill Monroe - the same album that would be nominated for "Best Bluegrass Album" at the 57th annual GRAMMY® Awards in 2015.

In 2019 Punch Brothers won a Grammy Award for best Folk Album for their album "All Ashore."

Discography

Solo recordings

Leftover Salmon

Punch Brothers

References

External links

 Punch Brothers Official Website
 Interview at ukbluegrass.com
 Banjo Newsletter Interview from 2008
 Banjo Newsletter Interview from 2004

Living people
Jewish American artists
Jewish American musicians
American bluegrass musicians
1981 births
Place of birth missing (living people)
American banjoists
Country musicians from Illinois
Leftover Salmon members
Punch Brothers members
Grammy Award winners
People from Skokie, Illinois
21st-century American Jews